Ralph Cullinan (born 14 August 1965) is a South African cricketer. He played in sixteen first-class and five List A matches from 1984/85 to 1992/93.

References

External links
 

1965 births
Living people
South African cricketers
Border cricketers
Free State cricketers
Cricketers from Kimberley, Northern Cape